Printing House Square was a London court in the City of London, so called from the former office of the King's Printer which occupied the site. For many years, the office of The Times stood on the site, until it relocated to Gray's Inn Road and later to Wapping. The site has been completely redeveloped.

References

Squares in the City of London
History of London
Newspaper headquarters in the United Kingdom